Megan, formerly called GO Searcher is a SpaceX Dragon recovery vessel. It is one of the offshore supply ships operated by Guice Offshore. The other identical ship is Shannon.

History 
Megan is the primary recovery vessel for the SpaceX Dragon/SpaceX Dragon 2 after the splashdown. Immediately after splashdown, fast small boats are launched to connect the capsule to the vessel, and the capsule is lifted on board with the large lifting frame installed on the stern. The astronauts can then exit the capsule. NASA has a requirement that this is completed within 60 minutes of splashdown. Facilities onboard include a helipad, a medical treatment unit, and extensive radar communication equipment.

Between April and May 2019, GO Searcher was temporarily reassigned with GO Navigator to fairing recovery operations for the ArabSat-6A, and Starlink 0.9 missions.

On August 2, 2020, Robert L. Behnken and Douglas G. Hurley returned to Earth, landing in the Gulf of Mexico, off the coast of Pensacola, Fla. GO Searcher'''s sister ship, GO Navigator, pulled the capsule onto her aft, in which Behnken and Hurley exited the capsule.

On September 18, 2021, GO Searcher served as the recovery vessel for the Inspiration4 mission, recovering its all-civilian crew from the Atlantic Ocean.

In early 2022, the vessel was renamed Megan after SpaceX Crew-2 astronaut, Megan McArthur along with GO Navigator being renamed Shannon after SpaceX Crew-1 astronaut, Shannon Walker. They are registered to Falcon Landing LLC, a SpaceX-linked company that also owns recovery ships Bob and Doug and Elon Musk's private jet.

List of recovery missions

 Incidents 

 According to United States Coast Guard, on May 9, 2020, while practicing recovering the SpaceX Dragon 2 capsule, GO Searcher''s crew pulled a man from the Atlantic Ocean.

Gallery

References 

Ships built in the United States
Ships built in Alabama
SpaceX Dragon 2
Space capsule recovery ships